The 2009–2010 Cyclo-cross Gazet van Antwerpen took place between 10 October 2009 and 21 February 2010. This season, all eight rounds took place in Belgium. Sven Nys won the overall trophy in the elite men category, followed by Zdeněk Štybar and Niels Albert.

Men results

See also
 2009–2010 UCI Cyclo-cross World Cup
 2009–2010 Cyclo-cross Superprestige

External links
 Gazet van Antwerpen Trofee

Cyclo-cross BPost Bank Trophy
Gazet van Antwerpen
Gazet van Antwerpen